Bridge Communications, Inc. was founded by Judy Estrin and Bill Carrico in 1981 and was based in Mountain View, California. Bridge Communications made computer network bridges, routers, and communications servers. They specialized in inter-connecting different kinds of networks.

According to Judy Estrin, Bridge Communications shipped the first commercial router.

Bridge Communications was acquired by 3Com on September 30, 1987.

References

Defunct networking companies